The bearded guan (Penelope barbata) is a species of bird in the family Cracidae, the chachalacas, guans, and curassows. It is found in Ecuador and Peru. Its natural habitat is subtropical or tropical moist montane forest. It is threatened by habitat loss.

Appearance
The bearded guan (Penelope barbata) is a small mostly brown bird that is about 55 cm large, and named for it red dewlap (or beard) While most of the bird is brown, it has dark grayish-brown upper parts and rear underparts as well as a silver crown and neck feathers. The bird also has white feathers edging its neck and breast, red legs, and a rufous tail.

Habitat
The bearded guan (Penelope barbata) lives at an altitude of 1200–3000 m in a humid environment located in northwest Peru and southern Ecuador.

Threats
The greatest threat to the bearded guan (Penelope barbata) is deforestation for agriculture and mining.

Diet
No information is known about the dietary habits of the bearded guan (Penelope barbata), however guans in general eat various fruits and berries and well as leaves, flowers and insects.

Reproduction
Bearded guan (Penelope barbata) are a monogamous, territorial species that mate at the beginning of the rain season (March–July).  Most species of Guan reach sexual maturity at two years and can reproduce until they reach the age of twenty. A pair of guan will produce a clutch of three eggs which the female will incubate for 24–28 days.

References

External links
BirdLife Species Factsheet.
Guans at FAO.org
Bearded Guan at Neotropical Birds (Cornell University)
Bearded Guan videos and photos on the Internet Bird Collection
Photo & specifics-High Res; Article oiseaux

bearded guan
Birds of the Ecuadorian Andes
Birds of the Peruvian Andes
bearded guan
Taxonomy articles created by Polbot